The women's field hockey tournament at the 2016 Summer Olympics was the tenth edition of the field hockey event for women at the Summer Olympics. It took place over a fourteen-day period beginning on 6 August, and culminating with the medal finals on 19 August. All games were played at the Olympic Hockey Centre in Deodoro, Rio de Janeiro, Brazil.

Great Britain won the gold medal for the first time after defeating defending champions the Netherlands 2–0  on a penalty shoot-out after a 3–3 draw. Germany won the bronze medal by defeating New Zealand 2–1.

The medals for the tournament were presented by Barry Maister, New Zealand; Camiel Eurlings, Netherlands; and Nicole Hoevertsz, Aruba; members of the International Olympic Committee, and the gifts were presented by Pam Elgar and Marijke Fleuren, executive board members of the International Hockey Federation and Leandro Negre, president of the International Hockey Federation.

Competition schedule
The match schedule of the women's tournament was unveiled on 27 April 2016.

Competition format
The twelve teams in the tournament were divided into two groups of six, with each team initially playing round-robin games within their group. Following the completion of the round-robin stage, the top four teams from each group advance to the quarter-finals. The two semi-final winners meet for the gold medal match, while the semi-final losers play in the bronze medal match.

Qualification

Each of the continental champions from five confederations receive an automatic berth. The host nation didn't qualify as they didn't place higher than fortieth in the FIH World Rankings by the end of 2014 nor finished no worse than seventh at the 2015 Pan American Games (they didn't even qualify for that tournament). This restriction was decided between the International Hockey Federation (FIH) and the International Olympic Committee (IOC) due to the standard of field hockey in Brazil. In addition to the seven highest placed teams at the Semifinals of the 2014–15 FIH Hockey World League not already qualified, the following twelve teams, shown with final pre-tournament rankings, will compete in this tournament.

Squads

Group stage
All times are local (UTC−3).

Group A

Group B

Knockout stage

Bracket

Quarter-finals

Semi-finals

Bronze medal match

Gold medal match

Final ranking

The medallists were:

Goalscorers

References

External links
Field hockey at Rio2016.com

 
Women's
2016
2016 in women's field hockey
International women's field hockey competitions hosted by Brazil
hockey